Kristian Woolf (born 6 July 1975) is an Australian professional rugby league football coach who is the head coach of Tonga at international level and the assistant coach of the Dolphins in the NRL.

He previously was the head coach of St Helens whom he coached to the 2020, 2021 and the 2022 Super League Grand Final wins, four straight for the club and three straight for Woolf. He was also interim head coach of the Newcastle Knights in the National Rugby League.

Playing career
Hailing from Mount Isa, Queensland, Woolf played for the Souths Magpies in Brisbane between 1996 and 1997.

Coaching career
In 2002, Woolf began his coaching career as an assistant coach for the Townsville Brothers in the Townsville & District Rugby League (TDRL) competition. At the same time, Woolf was teaching at Ignatius Park College and coaching their senior rugby league side, winning the Queensland State Schoolboys Championship in 2004.

In 2005, Woolf joined the North Queensland Cowboys as their junior development manager. After holding the role for four seasons, Woolf became the team's NYC coach in 2009. He took the side to the finals for the first time in 2010 and to their first Grand Final in 2011, which they lost in golden point to the New Zealand Warriors.

In 2012, Woolf joined the Brisbane Broncos as an assistant coach to Anthony Griffin.

In 2015, he returned to North Queensland as the inaugural coach of the new Intrust Super Cup side, the Townsville Blackhawks. In the club's first season, the side finished in first place and qualified for the Grand Final, losing to the Ipswich Jets.

Woolf was appointed head coach of the Tongan national team in 2014. In October 2015, Woolf recorded his first win with Tonga in the Asia-Pacific 2017 World Cup qualifying game against the Cook Islands. In 2016, Woolf's Tonga team suffered a second straight defeat by Samoa in the Polynesian Cup.

On 26 September 2018, Woolf officially left his role as Blackhawks' head coach, which he held for four seasons, to take up an assistant coaching position with the Newcastle Knights.

On 27 August 2019, Woolf was named interim head coach with Newcastle for the remainder of the 2019 season after Nathan Brown stepped down.

On 10 September 2019, it was announced that Woolf would take up the head coach role at St Helens in 2020, signing a two-year contract with the club having the option to extend a further year.

He coached St Helens in the club's 8-4 2020 Super League Grand Final victory over Wigan at the Kingston Communications Stadium in Hull.

He coached St Helens to victory in the 2021 Challenge Cup Final with a 26-12 victory over Castleford at Wembley Stadium.

On 9 October 2021, Woolf coached St Helens to their 2021 Super League Grand Final victory over the Catalans Dragons.

On 24 September 2022, Woolf coached St Helens in their 2022 Super League Grand Final victory over Leeds in his final game in charge of the club.

Tonga record

Personal life
Woolf's brother, Ben, is the current coach of the Tweed Heads Seagulls Queensland Cup side.

His sister Katie Woolf is one of Australia’s only female commercial talkback radio broadcasters, on Mix FM Darwin.
Meet Katie Woolf

References

1975 births
Living people
Australian rugby league players
Australian rugby league coaches
Newcastle Knights coaches
Rugby league players from Mount Isa
St Helens R.F.C. coaches
Tonga national rugby league team coaches